Methia is a genus of beetles in the family Cerambycidae, containing the following species:

 Methia acostata Linsley, 1940
 Methia aestiva Fall, 1907
 Methia argentina Bruch, 1918
 Methia arizonica Schaeffer, 1908
 Methia batesi Chemsak & Linsley, 1971
 Methia bicolor (Horn, 1885)
 Methia bicolorata Linsley, 1962
 Methia brevis Fall, 1929
 Methia carinata Linsley, 1940
 Methia curvipennis Chemsak & Linsley, 1965
 Methia debilis (Horn, 1895)
 Methia dentata Chemsak & Linsley, 1964
 Methia dolichoptera Lingafelter, 2010
 Methia dubia Linsley, 1940
 Methia enigma Martins, 1981
 Methia falli Martin, 1920
 Methia fischeri Melzer, 1923
 Methia flavicornis Casey, 1924
 Methia jamaicensis Philips & Ivie, 1998
 Methia juniperi Linsley, 1937
 Methia knulli Linsley, 1940
 Methia lata Knull, 1958
 Methia lineata Linsley, 1935
 Methia longipennis Martins, 1997
 Methia lycoides Chemsak & Linsley, 1971
 Methia maculosa Chemsak & Linsley, 1964
 Methia mormona Linell, 1897
 Methia necydalea (Fabricius, 1798)
 Methia occidentalis Chemsak & Linsley, 1964
 Methia pallidipennis Linsley, 1942
 Methia picta Linsley, 1942
 Methia robusta Linsley, 1940
 Methia subarmata Linsley, 1942
 Methia subvittata Chemsak & Linsley, 1964
 Methia taina Zayas, 1975
 Methia trium Gilmour, 1968
 Methia tubuliventris (Gounelle, 1913)
 Methia violaceipennis Chemsak & Linsley, 1964
 Methia vittata Chemsak & Linsley, 1964

References

Xystrocerini